Marco Crugnola and Alessio di Mauro were the defending champions, but only Crugnola tried to defend his title.
He partnered up with Philipp Marx, but they were eliminated in the first round by Leoš Friedl and Lovro Zovko.
James Cerretani and Travis Rettenmaier won in the final 4–6, 6–3, [11–9], against Peter Luczak and Alessandro Motti.

Seeds

Draw

Draw

References
 Doubles Draw

Zucchetti Kos Tennis Cup - Doubles
Internazionali di Tennis del Friuli Venezia Giulia
Zucchetti